Minimal-access cranial suspension is a form of facial surgery or rhytidectomy used to reduce wrinkles and lift sagging facial tissue and originally developed in Belgium. Facial tissues are accessed via an incision before the ear. Sutures are then used to lift the underlying tissue. These sutures are then anchored to the deep temporal fascia with purse-string sutures.

See also
 Cosmetic surgery
 Otolaryngology
 Maxillofacial surgery
 Plastic surgery
 Rhytidectomy
 Superficial muscular aponeurotic system (SMAS)

References

Further reading
 

Plastic surgical procedures
Oral and maxillofacial surgery
Otorhinolaryngology